Bichkhana is a village in Madhubani district, Bihar, India. It is 18 km west-north from the Madhubani railway station. The neighboring villages are Ektara, Jamuari, and Navkarhi. There is a small temple, "Hanuman Mandir", in the center of the village.

Language

The primary language of Bichkhana is Maithili.

Other Information

Block: Benipatti
Police station: Anrer
Post office: Ektara
Lok sabha : Madhubani
Vidhan Sabha: Benipatti
Pin : 847222

References

Villages in Madhubani district